Aforia is a genus of sea snails, marine gastropod mollusks in the family Cochlespiridae.

Description
The shell resembles Irenosyrinx, but with stronger sculpture and with a paucispiral operculum, bearing such a relation to the normal species of Turris as Mohnia bears to Chrysodomus.

Species
Species within the genus Aforia include:
 Aforia abyssalis Sysoev & Kantor, 1987
 Aforia aulaca (Dall, 1896)
 Aforia circinata (Dall, 1873)
 Aforia crebristriata (Dall, 1908)
 Aforia goniodes (Watson, 1881)
 Aforia goodei (Dall, 1890)
 Aforia hedleyi (Dell, 1990)
 Aforia hypomela (Dall, 1889)
 Aforia indomaris Sysoev & Kantor, 1988
 Aforia inoperculata Sysoev & Kantor, 1988
 Aforia kincaidi (Dall, 1919)
 Aforia kupriyanovi Sysoev & Kantor, 1987
 Aforia magnifica (Strebel, 1908)
 Aforia moskalevi Sysoev & Kantor, 1987
 Aforia multispiralis Dell, 1990
 Aforia obesa Pastorino & Sánchez, 2016
 Aforia persimilis (Dall, 1890)
 Aforia serranoi Gofas, Kantor & Luque, 2014
 Aforia staminea (Watson, 1881)
 Aforia tasmanica Sysoev & Kantor, 1988
 Aforia trilix (Watson, 1881)
 Aforia watsoni Kantor, Harasewych & Puillandre, 2016 (interim unpublished)
Extinct species from the Oligocene in Northern America
 † Aforia addicotti Javidpour, 1973
 † Aforia campbelli Durham 1944
 † Aforia dallamensis (Weaver, 1916)
 † Aforia ecuadoriana Olsson 1964 (Pliocene of Ecuador)
 † Aforia tricarinata Addicott, 1966
 † Aforia wardi (Tegland, 1933)
Species brought into synonymy
 Aforia chosenensis Bartsch, 1945: synonym of Aforia insignis (Jeffreys, 1883)
 Aforia diomedea Bartsch, 1945: synonym of Aforia circinata (Dall, 1873)
 Aforia gonoides (Watson, 1881 : synonym of Aforia goniodes (Watson, 1881)
 Aforia hondoana (Dall, 1925): synonym of Aforia circinata (Dall, 1873)
 Aforia insignis (Jeffreys, 1883): synonym of Aforia circinata (Dall, 1873)
 Aforia japonica Bartsch, 1945: synonym of Aforia circinata (Dall, 1873)
 Aforia lepta (Watson, 1881): synonym of Aforia watsoni Kantor, Harasewych & Puillandre, 2016
 Aforia okhotskensis Bartsch, 1945: synonym of Aforia circinata (Dall, 1873)
 Aforia sakhalinensis Bartsch, 1945: synonym of Aforia circinata (Dall, 1873)

References

 Bozzetti L. (1997) Description of a new genus and a new species (Gastropoda: Turridae, Turriculinae) from the Kerguelen Islands, southern Indian Ocean / Descrizione di un nuovo genere ed una nuova specie (Gastropoda: Turridae, Turriculinae) dalle Isole Kerguelen, Oceano Indiano meridionale. World Shells 23: 42–44
 Wiese V. (2001) Comments on a "new" turrid species from Kerguelen. Schriften zur Malakozoologie 18: 33–34
  GOFAS, Serge, Yuri KANTOR, and Ángel A. LUQUE. "A new Aforia (Gastropoda: Conoidea: Cochlespiridae) from Galicia Bank (NW Iberian Peninsula)." (2014): 45–51.
 Sysoev & Kantor, Deep-sea gastropods of the genus Aforia (Turridae)  of the Pacific: Species composition, Systematics, and functional morphology of the digerstive system; The Veliger, California Malacozoological Society Northern California Malacozoological Club v.30 (1987-1988)